Trnski Odorovci is a village in the municipality of Dimitrovgrad, Serbia. According to the 2002 census, the village has a population of 183  people.

References

External links

Populated places in Pirot District